The History of local government districts in Middlesex outside the metropolitan area began in 1835 with the formation of poor law unions. This was followed by the creation of various forms of local government body to administer the rapidly growing towns of the area. By 1934 until its abolition in 1965, the entire county was divided into urban districts or municipal boroughs.

Poor law unions 
The parishes of the county were grouped under the Poor Law Amendment Act 1834 to form unions. Each union had a single workhouse, and was administered by a board of guardians elected by the parish ratepayers. The boundaries of the unions would later be used to define rural sanitary districts in 1875 and rural districts in 1894. Poor law unions were abolished in 1930 by the Local Government Act 1929.

Local boards of health 

An outbreak of cholera in Tottenham forced the creation of a temporary local board of health in 1831/32. Following the enactment of the Public Health Act 1848, permanent boards could be formed on petition of the inhabitants or where there was excess mortality. The first local board in England formed under the Act was at Uxbridge in 1849, and it was followed by a number of other towns. The Local Government Act 1858 simplified the process of creating local councils: ratepayers of a parish or area could adopt the Act by resolution, whereupon it would become a Local Government District, governed by a Local Board. Numerous localities in Middlesex took the opportunity, and it also provided the mechanism for the developing communities of Southgate and Wood Green to separate themselves from the control of the Edmonton and Tottenham boards.

Sanitary districts 

The system was rationalised by the Public Health Act 1875, which designated all municipal boroughs, local board districts, local government districts and improvement commissioners districts in England and Wales as urban sanitary districts. The existing local authority became an urban sanitary authority, without change of title. Also created were rural sanitary districts, which were identical in area to poor law unions, less any urban sanitary district. The poor law guardians for the parishes in the district became the rural sanitary authority.

List of districts 1848–1894

Local Boards and Urban Sanitary Districts 1848–1894 

Local Board Districts (LBDs) were created by the Public Health Act 1848 and governed by a local board of health, Local Government Districts (LGDs) were created by the Local Government Act 1858 and governed by a local board. Chiswick was an Improvement Commissioners District (ICD) created by local act of parliament.

Rural sanitary districts 1875–1894

County Districts 1894–1965 

The Local Government Act 1894 divided the administrative county into four rural districts and thirty-one urban districts, based on existing sanitary districts. One urban district, South Hornsey was a detached part of Middlesex within the County of London until 1900, when it was transferred to the latter county. The rural districts were Hendon, South Mimms, Staines and Uxbridge.  Because of increasing urbanisation these had all been abolished by 1934. Urban districts had been created, merged, and many had gained the status of municipal borough by 1965. The districts as at the 1961 census were:

References 

Districts